Āli Musliyār (born Erikkunnan Pālattu Mūlayil Āli; 1861–1922) was  the leader of Malabar Rebellion, and a freedom fighter. 
Musliyār was the Imam of Tirurangadi Masjid from 1907 until his eventual execution at Coimbatore Prison for the allegation against him for calling to fight against British rule. He was an active orator of the Khilafat Movement in Malabar region.

Early life 
Āli Musliyar was born in Nellikkunattu desom, Eranad taluk, Malabar district to Kunhimoitīn Molla and Kōtakkal Āmina. Kōtakkal Āmina was a member of the infamous Maqdoom family of Ponnani, known for their radical islamist sect of religious law. Musliyar's grandfather, Mūsa, was one of several  "Malappuram Martyrs". Ali Musliyar began his education studying the Qur'an, tajwīd and the Malayālam language with Kakkadammal Kunnukammu Molla. He was sent to Ponnani Darse for further studies in religion and philosophy, under the tutelage of Sheikh Zainuddin Maqdum I (Akhir), which he successfully completed after 10 years.

He then went to Haram, Mecca for further education. Throughout this period, he was guided by several famous scholars, including Sayyid Ahmed Sahni Dahlan, Shiekh Muhammed Hisbullahi Makki, and Sayyid Husain Habshi. After spending seven years in Mecca, he went on to serve as the Chief Qasi in Kavaratti, Laccadive Islands.

Musliyar in Malabar 
In 1907 he was appointed as the Chief Musliyar of the mosque at Tirurangadi, Eranad taluk.

He became a Khilafat or Islamic Caliphate leader, on the introduction of the Khilafat movement, was installed as Caliph Emir on 22 August 1921 at the Jamat Mosque and issued edicts proclaiming his assumption, of office and directing that in future market fees, ferry and toll revenue from Jizya taxes on non-muslims belong to the Islamic  Khilafat Government.

He posed as a leader of the people. Islamic caliphate  Khilafat meetings were held regularly under Ali Musaliar, and "these constant preachings for jihad, combined with the resolution passed in the All-India Khilafat Conference at Karachi last July, led the Moplahs to believe that the end of British rule in India was near. Ali Musaliar and his lieutenants were making secret preparations for active jihad and direct hostility against the colonial government. Khilafat or Islamic Caliphate volunteers for holy jihad were recruited and made to swear on the Holy Koran that they would be ready to Martyr for the cause of the Khilafat in a holy war. Ali Musaliar also made his volunteer corps of Jihadis parade throughout the locality, armed and in their uniforms, and such demonstrations added to the strength of this mischievous movement." (Public Prosecutor's speech, West Coast Spectator, 6 October 1920).

The beginnings of the future Khilafat army of jihad were in the 'making, and, at an anti-non-co-operation Meeting held at Ponnani on 24 July to counteract the effects of the Khilafat agitation, Ali Musaliar, "turned up with his volunteer jihadi force of about 50 to 100 volunteers armed with big Khilafat knives and clad in Khilafat uniform, marching under a red flag, with shouts of Allah-Ho-Akbar. The volunteers rushed the Police in the bazaar."  (Judgement in Case No. 7/21).

The agrarian discontent, but it would appear that there was some trouble – what it was, it is not possible to say – between the Pookotur Moplahs and the Manager Tirumulpad of the Pookotur Estate. This lack of cordiality was aggravated by the police search instituted at the instance of the Manager, and V. Mohammad exploited the Khilafat movement and the radical islamist ideology of his co-religionists to wreak vengeance. and in this jungly, remote and fanatical hamlet of Pookotur, the civil administration practically ceased to function from 2 August 1921.

The revolt of 1921–22 began following the police attempt to arrest three Islamist leaders, of which Ali Musaliar was one, on 20 August 1921. Rumors were spread by Moplahs that the colonial government troops had destroyed the Mampuram Mosque, and the Moplah jihadi gangs were brought out in huge numbers, estimated to be between 15,000 and 30,000. This led to a large scale massacre of colonial troops, ethnic cleansing of native Hindu families including women and children and severe damage to the colonial government infrastructure including buildings, rail bridges, roads, etc. throughout South Malabar.

Although the colonial troops were quick to take the upper hand in many towns, a number of jihadi rebels initiated guerilla operations, forcing the colonial government to deploy additional military units and introduce "aggressive" patrolling. The revolt came to an end in February 1922. Ali Musliyar was among a dozen jihadi leaders who were tried and sentenced to death. He was subsequently hanged at the Coimbatore Prison on 17 February 1922.

In Dictionary of Martyrs 
His name is listed in the fifth volume of ‘The Dictionary of Martyrs, India’s Freedom Struggle from 1857 to 1947’

However,  the Indian Council of Historical Research considered removing the names of Ali Musliyar and 386 others from the Dictionary of Martyrs of India's Freedom Struggle for the ethnic cleansing of Hindus and being associated with the Khilafat Movement. But it has not been removed since.

References

External links 

 NY Times reports on the rebellion
 Military Occupy Riot area in India – Published: 28 August 1921, The New York Times
 Moplahs a menace for several years Published: 4 September 1921, The New York Times
 64 out of 100 Moplah prisoners suffocated in a closed car on Train in India – 22 Nov 1921, The New York Times
 More Moplah disorders – Published: 14 September 1921, The New York Times
 Ambush British in India – 2 September 1921, The New York Times

Indian Muslims
People from Malappuram district
Indian independence activists from Kerala
Mappilas
Indian rebels
1864 births
1922 deaths
20th-century executions by British India
People executed by British India by hanging
Executed Indian people